The 1970 Canadian Ladies Curling Association Championship the Canadian women's curling championship was held from February 23 to 27, 1970 the Stampede Corral in Calgary, Alberta.

British Columbia, Manitoba, and Saskatchewan all finished round robin play tied for first with 7–2 records, necessitating a tiebreaker playoff between the three teams to determine the championship. Team Saskatchewan, who was skipped by Dorenda Schoenhals captured the championship by defeating both Manitoba 8–6 in the semifinal and British Columbia 8–4 in the final. This was Saskatchewan's third championship and second in a row. This was the first time in history that a three-way tiebreaker determined the championship.

British Columbia's 13–0 victory over Quebec in Draw 7 was the second time in which a team posted a shutout in tournament history.

 The event had a then-record attendance of 13,796.
 Saskatchewan set a record for most points scored by a team in one event with 105. This included the two tiebreaker games they played for the championship. This would eventually end up being a pre-Scotties record (prior to ).
 BC's victories over Quebec in Draw 7 and Nova Scotia in Draw 9 set a record for fewest ends played in one game as both games only lasted six ends.
 BC's 12–11 victory over Prince Edward Island set a record for the largest come-from-behind victory after BC trailed 10–0 through six ends.

Event Summary
Heading into the Wednesday evening draw (Draw 7), there were five teams with a shot at the championship. Saskatchewan sat in first at 6–0, Manitoba was in second at 5–1, while both British Columbia and Quebec sat at 4–2, and Ontario was 3–3.

The Wednesday evening draw dwindled that number down to three. Saskatchewan remained unbeaten with their 13–9 victory over Nova Scotia and eliminating Ontario from contention despite their 11–7 win over New Brunswick. BC shutout Quebec 13–0, which eliminated Quebec while Manitoba held off Prince Edward Island 9–8. At this point, Saskatchewan appeared to be heading for a championship as a win over Manitoba on Thursday morning would clinch Saskatchewan the title.

The penultimate draw on Thursday morning would see a couple of comebacks that turned the event from an easy victory to coming down to the final draw. After scoring three in the seventh, Saskatchewan lead Manitoba 6–4. However, Manitoba would come back to tie the game at 6 with one in the eighth and a steal of one in the ninth. With Saskatchewan having hammer and a chance to clinch the championship in the last end, it was Manitoba who would steal three for a 9–6 victory and handing Saskatchewan their first loss of the tournament. Meanwhile, it appeared that BC would be eliminated as they trailed PEI 10–0 through six ends. But BC would score six in the seventh and steal one in the eighth to make it a game. After PEI scored one in the ninth, BC would score four to tie the game at 11 and force an extra end. BC remained alive as they completed the largest comeback in tournament history with a steal of one in the extra end for an improbable 12–11 win. Heading into the final draw, both Manitoba and Saskatchewan sat at 7–1 with BC one game back at 6–2.

The final draw of round robin play would end up as exciting as the previous draw. BC would do their job with a 12–3 victory over Nova Scotia to remain alive as they needed both Manitoba and Saskatchewan to lose to be in the playoff. Saskatchewan was in a back-in-forth battle with PEI as they were tied at 5 through seven ends. After a blank eighth end, PEI took a 7–5 lead heading into the final end. Saskatchewan would counter with two to force an extra end. But with hammer, PEI would score two for a 9–7 victory. Now it appeared that Manitoba would control their destiny as they lead 6–3 after seven ends against Ontario. However, Ontario would proceed to score one in the eighth and stole one in each of the next two ends to force an extra end. Ontario completed their comeback with a steal in the extra end for a 7–6 victory. This meant that a three-way tiebreaker playoff between BC, Manitoba, and Saskatchewan on Friday would determine the championship.

For the playoff, Manitoba and Saskatchewan drew the semifinal pairing while British Columbia received a bye into the final. In the semifinal on Friday morning, Saskatchewan regained their footing as they jumped out to a 6–3 lead through five ends and 8–4 after eight ends. Despite Manitoba cutting the lead to 8–6 after nine, it was too little too late as Manitoba conceded the final end, setting up a BC/Saskatchewan final.

In the championship on Friday afternoon, Saskatchewan scored two in the first end but BC scored singles in the next four ends to take a 4–2 lead at the halfway point. However, Saskatchewan scored three in the sixth to regain the lead then sealed the championship by stealing one in three straight ends for an 8–4 victory after BC conceded the tenth end.

Teams
The teams are listed as follows:

Round robin standings
Final Round Robin standings

Round robin results
All draw times are listed in Mountain Standard Time (UTC-07:00).

Draw 1 
Monday, February 23, 2:30 pm

Draw 2 
Monday, February 23, 8:00 pm

Draw 3 
Tuesday, February 24, 9:30 am

Draw 4 
Tuesday, February 24, 8:00 pm

Draw 5 
Wednesday, February 25, 9:30 am

Draw 6 
Wednesday, February 25, 2:30 pm

Draw 7 
Wednesday, February 25, 8:00 pm

Draw 8 
Thursday, February 26, 2:30 pm

Draw 9 
Thursday, February 26, 8:00 pm

Tiebreakers

Semifinal
Friday, February 27, 9:30 am

Final
Friday, February 27, 1:30 pm

References

Canadian Ladies Curling Association Championship, 1970
Scotties Tournament of Hearts
Curling competitions in Calgary
Canadian Ladies Curling Association Championship
Canadian Ladies Curling Association Championship
Canadian Ladies Curling Association Championship
Canadian Ladies Curling Association Championship